The black-lored cisticola (Cisticola nigriloris) is a species of bird in the family Cisticolidae.
It is found in Malawi, Tanzania, and Zambia.
Its natural habitat is subtropical or tropical dry shrubland.

References

black-lored cisticola
Birds of East Africa
black-lored cisticola
Taxonomy articles created by Polbot